GlobalSight is a free and open source translation management system (TMS) released under the Apache License 2.0. As of version 7.1 it supports the TMX and SRX 2.0 Localization Industry Standards Association standards. It was developed in the Java programming language and uses a MySQL database.  GlobalSight also supports computer-assisted translation and machine translation.

History
From 1997 to 2005 it was called Ambassador Suite and was developed and owned by GlobalSight Corp. that according to Red Herring magazine was one of the "ten companies to watch" in 1999. In 2005, Transware Inc. acquired it and continued its development. In May 2008, Welocalize acquired Transware and GlobalSight. In January 2009 after replacing the proprietary technology used in the product (workflow, database, object relationship mapping, middleware, directory management and scheduling) with open source components Welocalize released version 7.1.

Steering committee
The Steering committee formed by representatives of the main companies currently involved in the project are listed here.
Stephen Roantree from AOL
Mirko Plitt from Autodesk
Jessica Roland from EMC Corporation
Frank Rojas from IBM
Daniel McGowan from Novell
Martin Wunderlich
Melissa Biggs from Sun Microsystems
Tex Texin from XenCraft
Reinhard Schaler from The Rosetta Foundation
Phil Ritchie from VistaTEC
Sultan Ghaznawi from YYZ Translations
Derek Coffey from Welocalize

Other companies involved
In December 2008 there were four Language Service Providers involved in the project: Afghan Translation Service, Applied Language Solutions, Lloyd International Translations and VistaTEC.

Features
According to the Translator and Reviewer Training Guide and the GlobalSight vs WorldServer, the software has the following features:
Customized workflows, created and edited using graphical workflow editor
Support for both human translation and fully integrated machine translation (MT)
Automation of many traditionally manual steps in the localization process, including: filtering and segmentation, TM leveraging, analysis, costing, file handoffs, email notifications, TM update, target file generation
Translation Memory (TM) management and leveraging, including multilingual TMs, and the ability to leverage from multiple TMs
In Context Exact matching, as well as exact and fuzzy matching
Terminology management and leveraging
Centralized and simplified Translation memory and terminology management
Full support for translation processes that utilize multiple Language Service Providers (LSPs)
Two online translation editors
Support for desktop Computer Aided Translation (CAT) tools such as Trados
Cost calculation based on configurable rates for each step of the localization process
Filters for dozens of filetypes, including Word, RTF, PowerPoint, Excel, XML, HTML, JavaScript, PHP, ASP, JSP, Java Properties, Frame, InDesign, etc.
Concordance search
Alignment mechanism for generating Translation memory from previously translated documents
Reporting
Web services API for programmatic access to GlobalSight functionality and data
Although a plugin called Crowdsight intended to extend the functionality and support crowdsourcing, GlobalSight was found not suitable to support crowdsourcing processes that depend on redundant inputs.

Integration with other platforms
In 2011,  Globalme Language & Technology released an open source plugin which connects the back end of a Drupal or Wordpress website to GlobalSight. Publishers can send their content directly to GlobalSight using this CMS plugin.

Drupal CMS
In 2014 Globalme and Welocalize published an open source Drupal plugin to provide integration capabilities with the Drupal TMGMT translation management plugin.

See also

 vidby
 DeeplL

References

External links
GlobalSight official website
CMSwithTMS Drupal & Wordpress translation plugin

Translation software
Free software programmed in Java (programming language)
Computer-assisted translation software programmed in Java
Formerly proprietary software
Translation companies
Free software projects
Companies established in 1997
Computer-assisted translation